Tisamenus fratercula is a stick insect species native to the Philippine island Luzon.

Taxonomy 
James Abram Garfield Rehn and his son John William Holman Rehn described the species in 1939 as Hoploclonia fratercula. A male collected by W. Boetcher in Butucan in today's Batangas Province was deposited as holotype in the Academy of Natural Sciences of Drexel University. Females were not known until 2014. Rehn and Rehn placed the species in the Deplanata group they established within the genus. According to their description, this unites with Hoploclonia fratercula, Hoploclonia deplanata (today Tisamenus deplanatus), Hoploclonia cervicornis (today Tisamenus cervicornis), Hoploclonia armadillo (today Tisamenus armadillo), Hoploclonia spadix (today Tisamenus spadix) and Hoploclonia tagalog (today Tisamenus tagalog), relatively unspined species, with a flat upper surface, which except for the supra coxal spines on the edges of the thorax show no spines, but at most teeth. In 2004 the Filipino species were transferred back to the genus Tisamenus and only those occurring on Borneo were left in the genus Hoploclonia, the species is referred to as Tisamenus fratercula.

After specimens from the Ilocos region became known in 2014 that resembled the already breeding Tisamenus deplanatus from the Pocdol Mountains, it was briefly discussed whether both species are conspecific. Frank H. Hennemann identified these specimens as Tisamenus fratercula, following the description by Rehn and Rehn. A 2021 study based on genetic analysis, which included representatives of both stocks or species, confirmed separate species status. It was also shown that the species are not as closely related to one another as suspected in the 1939 grouping.

Description 
In contrast to Tisamenus deplanatus, the triangular area on the mesonotum typical for the genus is significantly longer and forms an isosceles triangle. The lateral mesonotum margins are not curved upwards as in other representatives of the genus, but rather flat. At the front base of the triangle on the mesonotum, the corners are drawn out into small spines. In contrast to the very similar Tisamenus tagalog, there is a clearly recognizable longitudinal edge on the triangle. Another difference to this species are the posteriores formed as paired spines on the second to fourth tergite of the  abdomen in Tisamenus fratercula. On the fifth, these are only formed as tubercles. In the case of Tisamenus tagalog, all posterior parts of the abdomen are only formed as tubercles. The body structures of the wider females are similar to those of the males.

In terraristics 
A stock to be found in the lovers' terrariums goes back to specimens that Thierry Heitzmann collected in 2014 in the Ilocos region. They were initially named after their place of discovery Tisamenus sp. 'Ilocos' and received PSG number 391 from the Phasmid Study Group. Hennemann identified this as Tisamenus fratercula, which was suggested by Sarah Bank et al. has been confirmed. Until these animals were found, the females of the species were not known. The species is very easy to keep and multiply. Leaves of bramble as well as other Rosaceae are eaten.

References

External links

Phasmatodea
Phasmatodea of Asia
Insects described in 1939